Goniobranchus collingwoodi, common name Collingwood's chromodoris, is a species of very colourful sea slug, a dorid nudibranch, a marine gastropod mollusc in the family Chromodorididae.

Distribution
This species was described from New Caledonia. It has been reported from Queensland, New South Wales,  Indonesia, Papua New Guinea and Hong Kong.

References

Chromodorididae
Gastropods described in 1987